As of the year 2020, Christianity had approximately 2.4 billion adherents and is the largest-religion by population respectively. According to a PEW estimation in 2020, Christians made up to 2.4 billion of the worldwide population of about 7.7 billion people. It represents nearly one-third of the world's population and is the largest religion in the world, with the three largest groups of Christians being the Catholic Church, Protestantism, and the Eastern Orthodox Church. The largest Christian denomination is the Catholic Church, with 1.3 billion baptized members. The second largest Christian branch is either Protestantism (if it is considered a single group), or the Eastern Orthodox Church (if Protestants are considered to be divided into multiple denominations).

Christianity is the predominant religion and faith in Europe (including Russia), the Americas, the Philippines, East Timor, Sub-Saharan Africa, and Oceania. There are also large Christian communities in other parts of the world, such as Indonesia, Central Asia, the Middle East, and West Africa where Christianity is the second-largest religion after Islam. The United States has the largest Christian population in the world, followed by Brazil,  Mexico, Russia, and the Philippines.

Christianity in multiple forms is the state religion of the following 15 nations: Argentina (Catholic Church), Armenia (Armenian Apostolic Church), Tuvalu (Church of Tuvalu), Costa Rica (Catholic Church), Kingdom of Denmark (Danish National Church), England (Church of England), Greece (Eastern Orthodox Church), Georgia (Eastern Orthodox Church), Iceland (Church of Iceland), Liechtenstein (Catholic Church), Malta (Catholic Church), Monaco      
(Catholic Church), Vatican City (Catholic Church), and Zambia. Christianity used to be the state religion of the former Ethiopian Empire (adopted in  340 A.D. by the Kingdom of Aksum) prior to the government's overthrow.

Lists

By country

Note: Population data are compiled using statistical science and are subject to observational error; these numbers should therefore be considered estimates only. The total number of Christians for each country is based on the number of people who are members of a Christian denomination or who identify themselves as Christian, plus their children. The number of people who actually believe in God or who regularly attend church is not addressed. People who mix Christianity with tribal religions are counted as Christians in this article. Most of the numbers for the Christian percentage of the population for each country were taken from the US State Department's International Religious Freedom Report, the CIA World Factbook, Joshua Project, Open doors, Pew Forum, and Adherents.com.

Top ten by numbers (2010) 
A list of the top ten countries by largest number of Christians according to Pew Research Center in 2010.

Top ten by percentage (2010) 
A list of the top ten countries by highest percentage of the population that is Christian according to Pew Research Center in 2010.

UN members and dependent territories

UN non member permanent observer states
note: One is a generally recognized sovereign state, while the other is a state with substantial, but limited, recognition

Non UN member or observer states with substantial, but limited recognition
Note: Includes non-United Nations members or observers with substantial, but limited recognition

Widely or fully unrecognized Non UN member or observer states

Christian-majority countries and territories 
According to a 2012 Pew Research Center study, of the then 232 countries and territories, 157 had Christian majorities. 126 countries had a Christian majority, while 71 countries had a Christian minority.

Countries by highest percentage of the population that is Christian with at least 10 million Christians:

Population growth

According to World Population Review, there were 2.4 billion Christians around the world in 2020. and according to a 2012 Pew Research Center survey, if current trends continue, Christianity will remain the world's largest religion by year 2050. According to a 2015 Pew Research Center study, Christianity is estimated to reach 3 billion adherents out of a projected population of 9.3 billion people in 2050, achieving parity with Muslim populations for the first time in history, which are predicted to be about 2.8 billion in 2050.

See also

 List of Christian denominations by number of members
 Catholic Church by country
 Eastern Orthodoxy by country
 Oriental Orthodoxy by country
 Protestantism by country
 List of the largest Protestant denominations

Other religions:
 Ahmadiyya by country
 Buddhism by country
 Hinduism by country
 Irreligion by country
 Islam by country
 Jewish population by country
 Judaism by country
 Sikhism by country

General:
 List of religious populations

Notes

References